Cathie Ryan is an Irish American singer-songwriter, who has released five CDs and tours steadily with her band performing at festivals, folk clubs, performing arts centers and with symphony orchestras. Known for "her crystalline vocals and insightful songwriting," Cathie Ryan has been one of the leading singers in Celtic music since her start in the 1980s. She first came to prominence in 1987 as lead singer of the Celtic music group, Cherish the Ladies, with whom she recorded two CDs. In 1995, she began her solo career.

Family
A first generation Irish-American from Detroit, Michigan (her parents are Mary Ryan (née Rice) from Asdee, County Kerry, and Timothy Ryan from Newport, County Tipperary), she moved to New York City at age seventeen to attend Fordham University. She now resides in County Louth, Ireland.

Discography
1997  Cathie Ryan  (Shanachie Records)
1998  The Music of What Happens  (Shanachie Records)
2001  Somewhere Along the Road  (Shanachie Records)
2005  The Farthest Wave  (Shanachie Records)
2012  Through Wind and Rain  (Mo Leanbh Records)

Collaborations and other appearances
1998  "Mother"  (North Star Records) with Robin Spielberg and Susan McKeown
2002  "Narada Presents: The Best of Celtic Christmas"  (Narada Records) various artist
2003  "A Woman's Heart – A Decade On"  (Dara Records) various artist

References

External links
Cathie Ryan Home page
Interview with Cathie Ryan

American expatriates in the Republic of Ireland
American women singers
American people of Irish descent
Living people
Year of birth missing (living people)
Singers from Detroit
21st-century American women